Răchita may refer to several places in Romania:

 Răchita, a village in Săsciori Commune, Alba County
 Răchita, a village in Șopotu Nou Commune, Caraș-Severin County
 Răchita (Rekettyő), a village in Dumbrava Commune, Timiș County
 Răchita, a tributary of the Bașeu in Botoșani County
 Răchita (Borod), a tributary of the Borod in Bihor County
 Răchita, a tributary of the Crivadia in Hunedoara County
 Răchita, a tributary of the Dâmbovița in Argeș County
 Răchita, a tributary of the Horezu
 Răchita (Nera), a tributary of the Nera in Caraș-Severin County 
 Răchita, a tributary of the Brabova in Dolj County
 Răchita, a tributary of the Râul Mare in Alba County
 Răchita, a tributary of the Râul Mic in Alba County
 Răchita, a tributary of the Volovăț in Botoșani County
 Valea Răchitelor, a tributary of the Barcău in Sălaj County

See also 
 Răchiți
 Răchitiș (disambiguation)
 Răchițele (disambiguation)
 Răchitova (disambiguation)
 Răchitoasa (disambiguation)